Stiphodon imperiorientis is a species of goby found on the southern Japan islands and in the mainland of South China.
  
This species can reach a length of  SL.

References

imperiorientis
Taxa named by Ronald E. Watson
Taxa named by Chen I-Shiung
Fish described in 1998